Haikou Meilan International Airport Co., Ltd. is a Chinese company. The company was the developer, owner and operator of the airport of the same name. However, the airport is now operated by the company's subsidiary HNA Infrastructure Co., Ltd. (formerly known as Hainan Meilan Airport).

History
Haikou Meilan International Airport Co., Ltd. was incorporated on 25 August 1998 by a consortium of Civil Aviation Administration of China (50%), Hainan Airlines (33.4%) China National Aviation Fuel Group (8.3%) and Hainan International Trust Investment Corporation (8.3%). The company takeover the development of the airport from Haikou Meilan International Airport Corporation, a subsidiary of Hainan Airport in the same year.

In 2000, HNA Group, an associate company of Hainan Airlines, became the controlling shareholder of the airport developer.

The company listed some of the assets to the Stock Exchange of Hong Kong as Hainan Meilan Airport (now known as HNA Infrastructure) in 2002. However, the runway was retained, despite the listed company had 20-year concession and obligation to maintain the runway.

Haikou Meilan International Airport was also in the consortium to acquire Bohai Trust. The stake were sold in 2012 to HNA Group.

In December 2016, the holding company decided to inject the runway of phase 1 to its listed subsidiary HNA Infrastructure in an all-share deal.

In August 2017, the company received a warning from China Securities Regulatory Commission regarding the incorrect information that was published.

Shareholders

Equity investments
 Grand China Air (8.30%)
 Hainan Airlines (7.08%; cross ownership)

References

Holding companies of China
Companies based in Hainan
Government-owned companies of China
Companies owned by the provincial government of China
Civilian-run enterprises of China
Privatization in China
Organizations based in Haikou
Airport operators of China